The year 1804 in art involved some significant artistic events and new works.

Events
Sculptor Pompeo Marchesi wins a scholarship to study in Rome under Antonio Canova.
Society of Painters in Water Colours, predecessor of the Royal Watercolour Society, founded in London by William Frederick Wells.

Works

Johann Friedrich Dryander – French troops before Saint-Jean-lès-Sarrebruck
Anne-Louis Girodet de Roussy-Trioson – Dominique Jean Larrey
Francisco Goya – Portrait of María Tomasa Palafox, Marquesa of Villafranca
Antoine-Jean Gros – Bonaparte Visiting the Plague Victims of Jaffa
Thomas Douglas Guest – Madonna and Child
Jean Auguste Dominique Ingres – Bonaparte, First Consul
Orest Kiprensky – Portrait of Adam Shvabler
Thomas Lawrence – Portrait of Caroline of Brunswick
Stepan Shchukin – Portrait of Andreyan Zakharov (approximate date)
George Stubbs – Ambrosio, a bay stallion, the property of Thomas Haworth
Benjamin West 
Cicero Discovering the Tomb of Archimedes
Thetis Bringing the Armor to Achilles (first version)
David Wilkie
Pitlessie Fair
William Chalmers-Bethune, his wife Isabella Morison and their Daughter Isabella

Awards
The Prix de Rome had been expanded in 1803 to include musical composition as a category, but was not awarded in 1804.
 Grand Prix de Rome, painting:
 Grand Prix de Rome, sculpture:
 Grand Prix de Rome, architecture:
 Grand Prix de Rome, music: (none awarded).

Births
 January 21 – Moritz von Schwind, Austrian painter (died 1871)
 February 21 – Charles-Joseph Traviès de Villers, French painter and caricaturist (died 1859)
 March 2 – Auguste Raffet, French illustrator and lithographer (died 1860)
 March 8 – Alvan Clark, American astronomer, telescope maker, portrait painter and engraver (died 1887)
 March 15 – Georgiana McCrae, English-born Australian painter (died 1890)
 April 4 – Andrew Nicholl, Irish painter (died 1886)
 April 16 – James Fahey, English landscape painter (died 1885)
 August 30 – Jacques Raymond Brascassat, French animal painter (died 1867)
 September 1 – John Scarlett Davis, English painter (died 1845)
 September 18 – John Steell, Scottish portrait sculptor (died 1891)
 September 27 – Anna McNeill Whistler, "Whistler's Mother" (died 1881)
 December 16 – Adèle Kindt, Belgian portrait and genre painter (died 1893)
 December 19 – Fitz Henry Lane, American luminist painter (died 1865)
 date unknown
 Chō Kōran, Japanese poet and nanga artist (died 1879)
 John Caspar Wild, Swiss-born American painter and lithographer (died 1846)

Deaths
 February 27 - Auguste-Louis de Rossel de Cercy, French painter primarily of naval scenes (born 1736)
 March 3 – Giovanni Domenico Tiepolo, Italian painter and printmaker in etching (born 1727)
 March 5 – Francis Sartorius, English painter of horses (born 1734)
 March 18 – Louis Jean Desprez, French painter and architect (born 1743)
 June 2 – Cornelius Høyer, Danish miniature painter (born 1741)
 October 29 – George Morland, English painter of animals and rustic scenes (born 1763)
 November 4 – Nicola Peccheneda, Italian painter (born 1725)
 November 5 – August Friedrich Oelenhainz, German painter (born 1745)
 December 12 – John Boydell, English engraver (born 1720)
 December 17 – Pierre Julien, French sculptor (born 1731)
 December 24 – Moses Haughton the elder, English designer, engraver and painter of portraits and still life (born 1734)
 date unknown
 Charles-Étienne Gaucher, French engraver (born 1740)
 Charles Grignion the Younger, British history and portrait painter and engraver (born 1754)
 Peter Haas, German-Danish engraver (born 1754)
 Nils Schillmark, Swedish-born painter who lived and worked in Finland (born 1745)
 Liu Yong, Chinese politician and calligrapher in the Qing Dynasty (born 1719)

References

 
Years of the 19th century in art
1800s in art